Jiří Jeslínek (born 16 April 1962) is a Czech former football defender. He played in major Czech football clubs such as Slavia, Dukla and Sparta Prague, and with Hajduk Split in Yugoslavia. He was also a member of the Czechoslovak national team.

Club career
After starting his career in 1980 with Slavia Prague he played between 1982 and 1984 with Dukla Prague and Rudá Hvězda Cheb to gain more experience before returning to Slavia and playing five consecutive seasons. In 1990, after a short spell with FK Union Cheb, he moved to HNK Hajduk Split playing back then in the Yugoslav First League. At the end of the season he returned to the Czechoslovak First League and signed with Sparta Prague where he played the 1991-92 season. Afterwards, he played one and a half seasons with FC Hradec Králové and three and a half with Dukla Prague, playing for both teams in the 1993–94 Gambrinus liga. He retired in 1997. While playing in Yugoslavia, his name was spelled Jirži Jeslinek.

National team
He was part of the Czechoslovak national team in the mid-1980s, having earned one cap in 1985.

Honours
Slavia Prague:
Intercup (1): 1986.
Dukla Prague:
Czechoslovak Cup (1): 1983
Hajduk Split:
Yugoslav Cup (1): 1991
Sparta Prague:
Czechoslovak Cup (1): 1992

References

External links
 
 
 Stats at Hajduk Split official website

1962 births
Living people
Footballers from Prague
Czech footballers
Czechoslovak footballers
Czechoslovakia international footballers
Association football defenders
Czech First League players
SK Slavia Prague players
Dukla Prague footballers
FK Hvězda Cheb players
AC Sparta Prague players
FC Hradec Králové players
HNK Hajduk Split players
Yugoslav First League players
Expatriate footballers in Yugoslavia
Czechoslovak expatriate sportspeople in Yugoslavia
Czechoslovak expatriate footballers